McAllister House in Seiling, Oklahoma is a Bungalow/Craftsman-style house was built in 1920;  it was built for Pat and Belva McAllister.  It was listed on the National Register of Historic Places in 1987.

It was deemed notable architecturally as a Bungalow/Craftsman work, and as the only textured stucco-faced house surviving in Seiling.

The house has 14 rooms, seven gables and a total of 52 windows, counting 12 windows on its sunporch in the back.  It was built at cost of $10,000 and has been regarded as the second finest home in Seiling.

The McAllisters were a prominent family in Seiling;  James McAllister was the first mayor of Seiling.

References

Houses on the National Register of Historic Places in Oklahoma
Houses completed in 1920
Houses in Dewey County, Oklahoma
National Register of Historic Places in Dewey County, Oklahoma